Marstoniopsis is a genus of minute freshwater snails with a gill and an operculum, aquatic gastropod mollusks or micromollusks in the family Amnicolidae.

Species
Species within the genus Marstoniopsis include:
 Marstoniopsis armoricana (Paladilhe, 1869)
 Marstoniopsis croatica Schütt, 1974
 Marstoniopsis graeca (Radoman, 1978)
 Marstoniopsis insubrica (Küster, 1853) - synonym: Marstoniopsis scholtzi (Schmidt, 1856)
 Marstoniopsis vrbasi Bole & Velkovrh, 1987

References

External links

Amnicolidae